is the third solo single by Tomomi Itano (a Japanese idol, a member of AKB48). It was released in Japan on April 25, 2012, on the label You, Be Cool! (a subsidiary of King Records).

The physical CD single reached second place in the Japanese Oricon weekly singles chart. According to Oricon, it was the 85th most selling CD single of the whole year 2012 in Japan.

Background 
The single was released in four versions: Type A, Type B, a regular edition, and a theater edition.

Track listing

Type A

Type B

Regular Edition

Theater Edition

Charts

Year-end charts

References

External links 
 Type A at Sony Music

2012 singles
Songs with lyrics by Yasushi Akimoto
Tomomi Itano songs
King Records (Japan) singles
2012 songs
Songs written by Katsuhiko Sugiyama